Joe or Joseph Perry may refer to:

Joseph Perry (cinematographer) (1863–1943), English-Australian pioneer filmmaker
Joseph Sam Perry (1896–1984), American district court judge
Joe Perry (American football) (1927–2011), American fullback
Joseph V. Perry (1931–2000),  American film and television actor a/k/a Joe Perry
Joseph N. Perry (born 1948), American Roman Catholic bishop of Chicago
Joe Perry (musician) (born 1950), American guitarist and vocalist with Aerosmith
Joe Perry (album), 2005 solo album
Joe Perry (politician) (born 1966), American legislator from Maine
Joe Perry (snooker player) (born 1974), English Triple Crown finalist

See also
Joel Perry (born 1985), Australian rules footballer in AFL
Joseph Berry (disambiguation)